USS Shada (SP-580) was a United States Navy patrol vessel in commission from 1917 to 1918.

Shada was built as a private motorboat of the same name in 1908 by George Lawley & Son at Neponset, Massachusetts. On either 3 or 28 April 1917, her owner, Mrs. G. W. Sortwell of Boston, Massachusetts, loaned her to the U.S. Navy for use as a section patrol vessel during World War I. She was commissioned on either 3 April or 22 May 1917 as USS Shada (SP-580).

Presumably assigned to the 1st Naval District in northern New England, Shada patrolled in Boston Harbor and along the New Hampshire and Maine coasts for the rest of World War I.

Shada was decommissioned on 2 December 1918 and returned to her owner on 23 April 1919.

Notes

References

Department of the Navy Naval History and Heritage Command Online Library of Selected Images: U.S. Navy Ships: USS Shada (SP-580), 1917-1919
NavSource Online: Section Patrol Craft Photo Archive: Shada (SP 580)

Patrol vessels of the United States Navy
World War I patrol vessels of the United States
Ships built in Boston
1908 ships